Yoong Bae (November 19, 1928 – November 14, 1992) was a Korean American painter and sculptor.

He was born in Seoul, Korea on November 19, 1928. He first visited the United States as a member of the Ford Foundation's Young Artist Program in 1963. He emigrated from South Korea in 1974.

Career 
Bae's solo exhibition "Works on Paper" was held at Soker-Kaseman Gallery in San Francisco in 1983. A posthumous solo exhibition was held at Jean Art Gallery in Seoul, South Korea in 2008.

His art explored themes related to Asian philosophy and spirituality, particularly Confucian and Zen ideas. His Dansaekhwa style of works were among those exhibited in a retrospective exhibition at the Asian Art Museum of San Francisco in 1996–1997.

Personal life 
Bae died on November 14, 1992 of cancer.

References

External links
Life and Works of Yoong Bae (1928–1992) (video) lecture by Kalpana Desai at Chong-Moon Lee Center for Asian Art and Culture's Asian Art Museum (asianart.org), January 9, 2015

American artists of Korean descent
20th-century American painters
American male painters
Artists from Seoul
1928 births
1992 deaths
20th-century American male artists